The 2011–12 AWHL season was the first season for the newly formed American West Hockey League. The AWHL was formed in the summer of 2011 by teams breaking away from the Northern Pacific Hockey League (NorPac). The league shared a similar area as the former America West Hockey League that merged into the North American Hockey League in 2003. Bozeman, Billings, Great Falls, and Helena all had teams in the old AWHL.

Regular season

Playoffs

AWHL semifinals
Missoula defeated Gillette in six games and Helena defeated Billings in five games to advance to the AWHL championship.

AWHL championship
Helena swept Missoula in four games in the AWHL championship to earn the first American West Hockey League championship.

USA Hockey Tier III Junior National Championship
The Helena Bighorns, Missoula Maulers, and Billings Bulls won the right to represent the AWHL at the 2012 USA Hockey Tier III Junior National Tournament.  Each team played three games in their pool, with the winners of each pool advancing to the national semifinals.

Helena won two games and lost one in pool play and did not advance to the semifinals. Missoula won two games and lost one in pool play and did not advance to the semifinals. Billings won all three games in their pool and advanced to the semifinals. They lost their semifinal game 4–2 to the eventual national champion Atlanta Jr. Knights of the EJHL South.

References

External links
 AWHL Website
 2011–12 AWHL Schedule

AWHL season
American West Hockey League seasons